Erebus mirans is a moth of the family Erebidae. It is found in Thailand.

References

Moths described in 1932
Erebus (moth)
Moths of Asia